Congolacerta is a genus of equatorial African lacertids of the family Lacertidae. Species of this genus are distributed in western East Africa.

Etymology
The name Congolacerta is a combination of "Congo" and "lacerta" (lizard). The common name is Congo Lizard.

Distribution
Congolacerta vauereselli occurs from the Lendu Plateau (west of Lake Albert in Democratic Republic of Congo) along the Albertine Rift and its foothills through southwestern Uganda, Rwanda, and northwestern Tanzania as far south as the Kabobo Plateau at the border of South Kivu and Katanga Provinces, Democratic Republic of Congo.
C. asukului is known from only four localities from a small area (550 km2) at the highest elevations of the Itombwe Plateau/South Kivu/Democratic Republic of Congo.

Habitat and natural history
Congolacerta are diurnal lacertid lizards which are good climbers on standing and fallen timber and rocky walls and presumably lay eggs. They emerge to bask as the morning warms up, and will then hunt for small arthropods.

Congolacerta vauereselli can be found in clearings and openings within Guineo-Congolian forests from 1000–2675 m altitude. In Parc National des Volcans/Rwanda this species lives only on the artificial volcanic rock wall (which is 1–2 m high) intended to keep buffalo (Syncerus caffer) inside the park boundary (buffalo wall). C. vauereselli is sympatric in this region with Adolfus jacksoni and were found basking within 3 m of each other on the wall. Adolfus jacksoni appeared to be more common than C. vauereselli. Spawls et al. (2002) mentions that C. vauereselli  is a true forest lizard, but it was never encountered in true forest or any other closed canopy habitat.

Congolacerta asukului occurs in high-elevation grasslands (more than 2650 m altitude) often near rocky outcrops of the Itombwe Plateau in the Albertine Rift Montane Forest ecoregion. They inhabit high-elevation meadows that are common amongst rivers, swamps, and subalpine scrub forests, which are dominated by tree heathers and other Ericaceae. Individuals were observed basking on rocks, and they retreat to small burrows amongst tussocks of grass.

Species
The following species are recognized as being valid.
 Congolacerta asukului  - Asukulu's grass lizard
 Congolacerta vauereselli  - sparse-scaled forest lizard

References

Further reading
Arnold, E.N. 1989. "Systematics and adaptive radiation of Equatorial African lizards assigned to the genera Adolfus, Bedriagaia, Gastropholis, Holaspis and Lacerta (Reptilia: Lacertidae)". Journal of Natural History 23: 525-555.
 Greenbaum, E., Villanueva, C.O., Kusamba, C., Aristote, M.M. & Branch, W.R. 2011. "A molecular phylogeny of Equatorial African Lacertidae, with the description of a new genus and species from eastern Democratic Republic of the Congo". Zoological Journal of the Linnean Society 163: 913–942.
Roelke, C.E. & Smith, E.N. 2010. "Herpetofauna, Parc National des Volcans, North Province, Republic of Rwanda". Check List 6 (4): 525-531.
Schmidt, K.P. 1919. "Contributions to the herpetology of the Belgian Congo based on the collection of the American Congo Expedition, 1909-1915. Part I. Turtles, crocodiles, lizards, and chameleons". Bulletin of the American Museum of Natural History 39 (2): 385–624.
Sternfeld, R. 1912. "Reptilia". pp. 197–279 + Tafeln VI-IX. In: Schubotz, H. (Editor). 1913. Wissenschaftliche Ergebnisse der Deutschen Zentral-Afrika-Expedition 1907-1908 unter Führung Adolf Friedrichs, Herzogs zu Mecklenburg, Band IV , Zoologie II. Leipzig: Klinkhardt & Biermann. 485 S. + 11 Tafeln. (in German).
Spawls, S., Howell, K.M., Drewes, R.C. and Ashe, J. 2002. "A Field Guide to the Reptiles of East Africa". Academic Press, Elsevier Science, San Diego, San Francisco, New York, Boston, London.
Tornier, G. 1902. "Herpetologisch Neues aus Ost-Afrika". Zoologischer Anzeiger 25: 700-704.(in German).

External links
For photos of the species see
 Congolacerta asulului on lacerta.de
Congolacerta vauereselli on lacerta.de

 
Lizard genera
Taxa named by Eli Greenbaum
Taxa named by Cesar O. Villanueva
Taxa named by Chifundera Kusamba
Taxa named by Mwenebatu M. Aristote
Taxa named by William Roy Branch